Dolly may refer to:

Tools
Dolly (tool), a portable anvil
 A posser, also known as a dolly, used for laundering
 A variety of wheeled tools, including:
Dolly (trailer), for towing behind a vehicle
Boat dolly or launching dolly, a device for launching small boats into the water
Camera dolly, platform that enables a movie or video camera to move during shots
Hand truck, sometimes called a dolly
Flatbed trolley, sometimes called a dolly

People
 Dolly (name), a list of people with the given name or nickname
 Dolly Buster, stage name of Czech-German former porn actress, filmmaker and author Nora Baumberger (born 1969)
 Dolly Dawn, American singer Theresa Maria Stabile (1916–2002)

In arts and entertainment

Fictional characters 
 One of Bonnie's toys in the film Toy Story 3
 Dolly Gopher, in the television film Re-Animated
 Dolly Gallagher Levi, in the movie Hello Dolly
 Dolly for Sue, from the 1964 film Rudolph the Red-Nosed Reindeer
 Dolly (character), from The Story of Tracy Beaker
 In the film Sea Monsters: A Prehistoric Adventure, short for Dolichorhynchops
 One of the characters from 101 Dalmatian Street

Film and television 
Dolly shot, a type of film sequence
Dolly!, a 1976 television show starring Dolly Parton
Dolly (TV series), 1987 television show starring Dolly Parton

Music
Dolly (French band)
Dolly (Japanese band)
Dolly (Fauré), a collection of duet pieces for piano by Gabriel Fauré
Dolly (album), a 1975 album by Dolly Parton
"Dolly", a song by rapper Lil Tecca feat. Lil Uzi Vert

Print
Dolly (magazine), an Australian publication
"Dolly" (story), a 2011 short story by Elizabeth Bear

Other uses
Tropical Storm Dolly, various storms
Dolly (sheep), the first mammal cloned from an adult somatic cell
Dolly (company), a Brazilian company and soft drink brand
Dolly's Cay, or Dolly's Rock, Bahamas
Mephedrone, drug referred to in slang as "dolly" or "dollies" 
Dolly, fanclub of the Korean musical group F-ve Dolls

See also
 Dolly mixture, a British confection
 Dolley, a similarly spelled given name
 Doily, an ornamental mat
 Dollie (disambiguation)